INS Sindhudhvaj (S56) was a  of the Indian Navy in service from 1987 until 16 July 2022, when she was decommissioned.

The name Sindhudhvaj means "flag bearer at sea". The submarine's crest depicts a grey nurse shark. Sindhudhvaj was the submarine to operationalise several indigenously built systems including the USHUS sonar, the Rukmani and MSS satellite communication systems, the inertial navigation system and the torpedo fire control system.

The submarine also completed a successful mating and personnel transfer with a deep-submergence rescue vehicle. It was the only submarine to be awarded the Chief of the Naval Staff's Rolling Trophy for Innovation by Prime Minister Narendra Modi.

References

Sindhughosh-class submarines
Attack submarines
Ships built in the Soviet Union
1987 ships
Submarines of India

kn:ಐ.ಎನ್.ಎಸ್ ಸಿಂಧುಘೋಷ್ (ಎಸ್೫೫)